Jacob John Anderson (born 22 March 1997) is an Australian field hockey player who plays as a forward for the Australian national team.

Personal life
Anderson grew up in Mackay, Queensland.

Other Mackay natives, Matthew Swann and Kirstin Dwyer, served as an inspiration for Anderson as he pursued hockey.

Career

Junior national team
Anderson was first named in the 'Burras' squad in 2016. The following year he represented the Under 21 side at the 2017 Sultan of Johor Cup where the team won a gold medal.

Senior national team
Anderson made his international debut for the Kookaburras in 2018, in a test match against Argentina. Following this, he was a member in the Australia team at the 2018 Men's International Hockey Open in Darwin.

In November 2018, Anderson was named in the Kookaburras squad for the 2019 calendar year.

References

External links 
 
 
 

1997 births
Living people
Sportspeople from Mackay, Queensland
Sportsmen from Queensland
Australian male field hockey players
Male field hockey forwards
Field hockey players at the 2022 Commonwealth Games
Commonwealth Games gold medallists for Australia
Commonwealth Games medallists in field hockey
Medallists at the 2022 Commonwealth Games